Hussein Ali Dokmak (13 December 1981 – 13 June 2007) was Lebanese footballer who played as a defender. He was killed by a car bomb, alongside other victims, in an assassination attempt on Lebanese politician Walid Eido.

Career 
Dokmak joined Nejmeh on 21 May 1997, playing for them until his death in 2007. He was also called up to represent Lebanon internationally at the 2004 AFC Asian Cup qualifiers, but didn't make an appearance.

Death 
On 13 June 2007, Dokmak died in the same car bomb which killed politician Walid Eido and teammate Hussein Naeem outside the Rafic El-Hariri Stadium.

References 

Lebanese footballers
1981 births
2007 deaths
Association football defenders
Lebanese Premier League players
Nejmeh SC players
People from Bint Jbeil District
Deaths by car bomb in Lebanon
Male murder victims